Alfonso Montemayor Crespo (28 April 1922 – 23 November 2012) was a Mexican football defender who played for Mexico in the 1950 FIFA World Cup. He also played for Club León.

References

External links
FIFA profile

1922 births
Mexico international footballers
Association football defenders
Club León footballers
Footballers from Tamaulipas
People from Tampico, Tamaulipas
1950 FIFA World Cup players
2012 deaths
Mexican footballers